Sumter Township is a township in McLeod County, Minnesota, United States. The population was 558 at the 2000 census.

Sumter Township was named after Fort Sumter, the Civil War fort.

Geography
According to the United States Census Bureau, the township has a total area of 35.8 square miles (92.6 km), of which 35.0 square miles (90.6 km)  is land and 0.8 square mile (2.0 km)  (2.18%) is water.

Demographics
As of the census of 2000, there were 558 people, 184 households, and 153 families residing in the township.  The population density was 15.9 people per square mile (6.2/km).  There were 188 housing units at an average density of 5.4/sq mi (2.1/km).  The racial makeup of the township was 95.16% White, 0.18% Pacific Islander, 4.48% from other races, and 0.18% from two or more races. Hispanic or Latino of any race were 5.56% of the population.

There were 184 households, out of which 41.3% had children under the age of 18 living with them, 78.8% were married couples living together, 2.2% had a female householder with no husband present, and 16.8% were non-families. 14.7% of all households were made up of individuals, and 6.5% had someone living alone who was 65 years of age or older.  The average household size was 3.03 and the average family size was 3.40.

In the township the population was spread out, with 29.0% under the age of 18, 6.6% from 18 to 24, 29.4% from 25 to 44, 25.6% from 45 to 64, and 9.3% who were 65 years of age or older.  The median age was 37 years. For every 100 females, there were 108.2 males.  For every 100 females age 18 and over, there were 105.2 males.

The median income for a household in the township was $52,813, and the median income for a family was $57,500. Males had a median income of $32,813 versus $23,942 for females. The per capita income for the township was $21,013.  None of the families and 0.4% of the population were living below the poverty line, including no under eighteens and none of those over 64.

References

Townships in McLeod County, Minnesota
Townships in Minnesota